Crossgar railway station was on the Belfast and County Down Railway which ran from Belfast to Newcastle, County Down in Northern Ireland.

History

The station was opened by the Belfast and County Down Railway on 23 March 1859.

The station closed to passengers in 1950, by which time it had been taken over by the Ulster Transport Authority.

References 

 
 
 

Disused railway stations in County Down
Railway stations opened in 1859
Railway stations closed in 1950
1859 establishments in Ireland
Railway stations in Northern Ireland opened in the 19th century